Bering Nunatak is a nunatak lying east-southeast of Mount Carrara in the Sky-Hi Nunataks. It was named by the Advisory Committee on Antarctic Names after Edgar A. Bering, a physicist at the University of Houston, who carried out upper atmosphere research at Siple Station in 1980–81.

References
 

Nunataks of Palmer Land